Gerald Lewis Bray (born 16 November 1948) is a British theologian, ecclesiastical historian and  priest in the Church of England.

Teaching
Born in Montreal, Quebec, on 16 November 1948, Bray holds a BA from McGill University and a MLitt and DLitt from University of Paris-Sorbonne. He was librarian of Tyndale House, Cambridge, from 1975 to 1978 when he was ordained in the Church of England and served in the parish of St Cedd, Canning Town (Diocese of Chelmsford), until 1980. From 1980 to 1992 he taught ecclesiastical history and doctrine at Oak Hill Theological College in London. From 1993 to 2006 he taught at Beeson Divinity School where he is now a research professor. He is now also Distinguished Professor of Historical Theology at Knox Theological Seminary. He is the director of research at the Latimer Trust at Oak Hill Theological College in London.

Writing
Bray's book, Biblical Interpretation: Past and Present, was one of Christianity Today's books of the year in 1997.

He has written extensively on the history of the canon law of the Church of England, publishing two major works on the subject, The Anglican Canons 1529-1947 and Tudor Church Reform, both of which were sponsored by the Church of England Record Society. He also edited the Convocation records of the Churches of England and Ireland from the Middle Ages to the nineteenth century. Bray was also the editor of the Churchman academic journal from 1983 to 2018.

His most important recent books are God is Love, a Biblical and Systematic Theology, published by Crossway (2012) and "God has spoken. A history of Christian theology", also published by Crossway in 2014.

Since then he has published Augustine and the Christian Life (Crossway, 2015), The Church: A theological and historical account (Baker, 2016) and an edition of the Books of Homilies of the Church of England (James Clarke, 2016). In 2017 he published a critical edition of the Procès-Verbal de l'Assemblée Générale du Clergé de France (1788), an important witness to the French pre-revolution from the Archives Nationales in Paris.

In 2021 he published The History of Christianity in Britain and Ireland (Apollos), a magisterial study of its subject. He also published The Attributes of God (Crossway) and Anglicanism (Lexham Press) in the same year.

Bibliography
Holiness and the Will of God: Perspectives on the Theology of Tertullian (1979) (New Foundations Theological Library)
The Doctrine of God (Contours of Christian Theology) (1993)
Biblical Interpretation: Past and Present (2000) 
God Under Fire (with Douglas S. Huffman, Eric L. Johnson, R. Douglas Geivett, Bruce A. Ware, Charles Gutenson, James S. Spiegel, Mark R. Talbot, William Lane Craig, Paul Helm, D. A. Carson, 2002)
Yours Is the Kingdom: A systematic theology of the Lord's Prayer (IVP, 2007) 
Always Reforming: Explorations in Systematic Theology (with Stephen Williams, Kevin J. Vanhoozer, Richard C. Gamble, Henri Blocher, Jr Richard B. Gaffin, Cornelis P. Venema, Derek W. H. Thomas, Andrew T. B. McGowan, John Frame, 2007) 
Creeds, Councils and Christ: Did the Early Christians Misrepresent Jesus? (2009) 
We Believe in One God (Ancient Christian Doctrine) (2009) 
The Faith We Confess: An Exposition of the Thirty-Nine Articles (2009) 
Translating the Bible: from William Tyndale to King James (2010) 
Galatians, Ephesians (Reformation Commentary on Scripture: New Testament) (2011) 
The Deity of Christ (Theology in Community) (Christopher W. Morgan (ed.), Robert A. Peterson (ed.), Alan W. Gomes, J. Nelson Jennings, Andreas J. Kostenberger, Stephen J. Nichols, Raymond C. Ortlund Jr., Stephen J. Wellum, 2011)
God Is Love: A Biblical and Systematic Theology (2012) 
The Very Pure Word of God: The Book of Common Prayer as a Model of Biblical Liturgy (2012) Peter Adam (Author), Mark Burkill (Editor), Gerald L Bray (Editor) 
The Kingdom of God (Theology in Community) (2012) Robert A. Peterson, Bruce K Christopher, W. Morgan 
Why We Belong: Evangelical Unity and Denominational Diversity (2013) Anthony L. Chute (Author, Editor), Christopher W. Morgan (Author, Editor), Robert A. Peterson (Author, Editor), Gerald Bray (Contributor), Bryan Chapell (Contributor), David Dockery (Contributor), Timothy George (Contributor), Bryan D. Klaus (Contributor), Douglas A. Sweeney (Contributor), Timothy C. Tennent (Contributor) 
Fallen (Theology in Community) (2013) Christopher W. Morgan (Author), Robert A. Peterson (Author), Gerald Bray (Author), David B. Calhoun (Author), D. A. Carson (Author), Bryan Chapell (Author), Paul R. House (Author), John W. Mahony (Author), Douglas J. Moo (Author), Sydney H. Page (Author) 
God Has Spoken: A History of Christian Theology (Crossway, 2014) 
Augustine on the Christian Life: Transformed by the Power of God (2015) 
Heresy, Schism and Apostasy (Latimer Studies Book 67) (2015) 
The Church: A Theological and Historical Account (Baker Academic, 2016) 
The Pastoral Epistles (International Theological Commentary) (T&T Clark, 2019) 
Doing Theology with the Reformers (IVP Academic, 2019) 
Preaching the Word with John Chrysostom (Lexham, 2020) 
The Attributes of God: An Introduction (Crossway, 2021) 
Anglicanism: A Reformed Catholic Tradition (Lexham, 2021) 
The History of Christianity in Britain and Ireland: From the first century to the twenty-first (Apollos, 2021)

References

Living people
Samford University people
20th-century Church of England clergy
21st-century Church of England clergy
Academic journal editors
McGill University alumni
University of Paris alumni
Editors of Christian publications
1948 births
Clergy from Montreal
Systematic theologians
Historians of Christianity
Evangelical Anglican theologians
British historians of religion
Canadian expatriates in France
Canadian emigrants to the United Kingdom